Bereslavka may refer to the following places:
 Bereslavka, Kazakhstan, a village in the Aiyrtau District, North Kazakhstan Region 
 Bereslavka, Russia, a village in Kalachyovsky District, Volgograd Oblast
 Bereslavka, Ukraine, a village in the Bobrynets Raion, Kirovohrad Oblast